Sabine Appelmans was the defending champion, but did not compete this year.

Barbara Paulus won the title by defeating Yi Jing-Qian 6–4, 6–3 in the final.

Seeds

Draw

Finals

Top half

Bottom half

References
 Official results archive (ITF)
 Official results archive (WTA)

Singles
Volvo Women's Open - Singles
 in women's tennis